Vít Jonák (born July 17, 1991) is a Czech professional ice hockey player who currently plays with VHK Vsetín in the Czech 1.liga. He previously played for Bílí Tygři Liberec in the Czech Extraliga.

References

External links

1991 births
Living people
BK Mladá Boleslav players
Czech ice hockey forwards
HC Benátky nad Jizerou players
HC Bílí Tygři Liberec players
Motor České Budějovice players
VHK Vsetín players